State highway loops in Texas are owned and maintained by the Texas Department of Transportation (TxDOT).

List
List of state highway loops in Texas (1–99)
List of state highway loops in Texas (100–199)
List of state highway loops in Texas (200–299)
List of state highway loops in Texas (300–399)
List of state highway loops in Texas (400–499)
List of state highway loops in Texas (500–9999)

See also
List of state highway spurs in Texas

External links
Texas Department of Transportation

State Highway Loops